Laura Woods is an Irish television presenter and radio host.

Career

Whilst in her third year at Trinity, Woods began her broadcasting career by working as a continuity announcer on RTÉ Radio.  In 1999, she presented the Breakfast Show on Trinity FM. She joined RTÉ Television as a continuity announcer in 2000.

Moving from continuity announcing in September 2002, Woods became the face of iD(renamed iD Two in late 2004) and remained there until May 2005. In 2004 she began co-presenting three series of The Cafe with Aidan Power. Woods anchored RTÉ's coverage of the Festival of World Cultures in 2005 and 2006, and joined Dave Fanning in Hyde Park to cover Live8 in July 2005. In September 2005, she began hosting SMS, but left the show to concentrate on presenting the Irish National Lottery game show Winning Streak from January–March 2006 while regular presenter Derek Mooney was presenting You're a Star.

Woods hosted another Irish National Lottery game show Fame and Fortune in June 2006, and went on to present the show's successors, The Trump Card from June–August 2007, and The Big Money Game from June–August 2008. In 2007, she also began presenting an event guide on 2fm's The Will Leahy Show and made an appearance on the People in Need Telethon. She appeared as a participant on Anonymous in the first half of 2008.

Woods has since moved to independent station Virgin Media Television, where she was a panellist on the Midday programme, and she now co-presents the breakfast show Ireland AM.

References

External links
 Laura Woods' profile

20th-century Irish people
21st-century Irish people
Living people
Alumni of Trinity College Dublin
Alumni of Griffith College
Ireland AM hosts
Irish game show hosts
Radio personalities from the Republic of Ireland
RTÉ television presenters
Irish women radio presenters
Irish women television presenters
Year of birth missing (living people)